Rapti Bobani is a village in the municipality of Trebinje, Republika Srpska, Bosnia and Herzegovina and partially in the municipality of Ravno, Bosnia and Herzegovina.

Demographics 
According to the 2013 census, its population was 6, all Serbs with 4 living in the Trebinje part  and two in the Ravno part.

References

Populated places in Ravno, Bosnia and Herzegovina
Populated places in Trebinje